Nadeo Argawinata (born 9 March 1997) is an Indonesian professional footballer who plays as a goalkeeper for Liga 1 club Bali United and the Indonesia national team.

Club career

Borneo
After years of training in youth clubs in Kediri Regency on Java island, Argawinata moved to Borneo island to look for professional playing time and joined Borneo F.C. for the 2016 Indonesia Soccer Championship A.

At the age of 19, he became the youngest goalkeeper to play in the highest level of Indonesian football. Argawinata made his first appearance on 22 March 2016 in 2016 Bhayangkara Cup, coming on as a substitute for Galih Sudaryono in the 75th minute, then the final result, Borneo lost 3–1 against PS TNI. 

Argawinata made his first official Liga 1 appearance on 3 June 2017 in a East Kalimantan Derby, coming on as an starter in a 3–2 lost with Persiba Balikpapan at the Parikesit Stadium. He was Borneo's starting goalkeeper in the 2018 Liga 1 and 2019 Liga 1 seasons. His stable performance earned him a spot in the Indonesia national under-23 football team that competed in the 2019 Southeast Asian Games.

Bali United
After he won national recognition through his performance in the 2019 Southeast Asian Games, Bali United contracted him from Borneo on 29 December 2019. However, he failed to win the starting spot in 2020 and 2021 due to the continued prominence of Bali's veteran goalkeeper Wawan Hendrawan.

Argawinata made his first league debut on 23 October 2021 in a Liga 1, coming on as an starter in a 1–2 lost with Bhayangkara at the Maguwoharjo Stadium.

International career
Nadeo is mostly known for his breakout performance at the 2019 Southeast Asian Games in the Philippines with the Indonesia national under-23 football team that won silver. Before that, he played one game with Indonesia national under-19 football team in 2015. He received his first call to join the senior Indonesia national football team in May 2021. He earned his first cap in friendly match against Oman on 29 May 2021. 
On 25 December 2021, Nadeo stopped a 90th-minute penalty from Singapore international Faris Ramli in his seventh international appearance of senior team, arguably the most crucial moment in the 2020 AFF Championship semifinal match against the host. As the score remained 2-2, the match continued into extra, time during which Indonesia added two goals that ushered the Garuda into the final. Argawinata's save became one of the most viewed clips in Indonesia in the last week of 2021. 

Nadeo helped the national team qualify for the 2023 AFC Asian Cup. In the qualifiers, Nadeo stopped a penalty from Jordan. In September 2022, he was part of the starting eleven in a friendly match against Curaçao which resulted in a 3–2 win. Nadeo was also called for up for the 2022 AFF Championship.

Career statistics

Club

International

Honours

Club 
Bali United
 Liga 1: 2021–22

International 
Indonesia U-23
 Southeast Asian Games  Silver medal: 2019
Indonesia
 AFF Championship runner-up: 2020

References

External links
 Nadeo Argawinata at PSSI
 

Indonesian footballers
1997 births
Living people
Borneo F.C. players
Bali United F.C. players
Liga 1 (Indonesia) players
People from Kediri (city)
Sportspeople from East Java
Indonesia youth international footballers
Indonesia international footballers
Association football goalkeepers
Competitors at the 2019 Southeast Asian Games
Southeast Asian Games silver medalists for Indonesia
Southeast Asian Games medalists in football
21st-century Indonesian people